Juan Daniel Rojas Carvacho (born 7 August 1957) is a Chilean former footballer who played as a forward for clubs in Chile and Mexico.

Playing career
With an extensive career in his homeland, he made his debut in Aviación in 1975.

In the second level, he played for Independiente de Cauquenes and Malleco Unido.

In the Chilean Primera División, he also played for Coquimbo Unido, Magallanes, Colo-Colo and Unión Española.

Abroad, he played for the Mexican club Atlético Potosino in the 1988–89 season, coinciding with his compatriot Luis Castro.  

His last club was Palestino in 1989 in the second level, taking part in the final match against Universidad de Chile.

International career
Rojas made twelve appearances for the Chile national team in 1983, including two appearances in the 1983 Copa América.

Personal life
Rojas was nicknamed El Rápido (The Fast One).

Honours
Colo-Colo
 Chilean Primera División: 1983
 Copa Polla Gol: 1985

Chile
 :

References

External links
 
 Juan Rojas at PlaymakerStats.com
 Juan Rojas at SoloFutbol.cl 

1957 births
Living people
Chilean footballers
Chilean expatriate footballers
Chile international footballers
1983 Copa América players
C.D. Aviación footballers
Independiente de Cauquenes footballers
Coquimbo Unido footballers
Malleco Unido footballers
Deportes Magallanes footballers
Magallanes footballers
Colo-Colo footballers
Unión Española footballers
Atlético Potosino footballers
Club Deportivo Palestino footballers
Chilean Primera División players
Primera B de Chile players
Liga MX players
Chilean expatriate sportspeople in Mexico
Expatriate footballers in Mexico
Association football forwards
Place of birth missing (living people)